The 2022 U Sports Women's Ice Hockey Championship was held March 24–27, 2022, in Charlottetown, P.E.I., to determine a national champion for the 2021–22 U Sports women's ice hockey season. The top-seeded Concordia Stingers defeated the sixth-seeded Nipissing Lakers to win the third championship in program history and first since the back-to-back titles in 1998 and 1999. The Stingers did not allow a goal during the tournament with three straight shutouts and all but one of the 11 games featured a shutout.

Host
The tournament was played at MacLauchlan Arena at the University of Prince Edward Island. It is the second consecutive tournament to be hosted by UPEI, as well as their second time hosting overall. This was the first U Sports women's ice hockey championship played since 2019 following two years of cancelled tournaments due to the COVID-19 pandemic in Canada.

Participating teams

Championship bracket

Consolation bracket

References

External links 
 Tournament Web Site

U Sports women's ice hockey
Ice hockey in Prince Edward Island
2021–22 in Canadian ice hockey
Sport in Charlottetown